Saint-Gérand is a former commune in the Morbihan department of Brittany in north-western France.  It is close to the larger town of Pontivy. On 1 January 2022, it was merged into the new commune Saint-Gérand-Croixanvec.

Demographics
Inhabitants of Saint-Gérand are called in French Géranais.

See also
Communes of the Morbihan department

References

External links

Saintgerand
States and territories disestablished in 2022